Possibilism, possibilist or possibilistic may refer to:

 Possibilism (geography), a theory of cultural geography 
 Possibilism (politics), an 1880s faction of the Federation of the Socialist Workers of France
 Possibilism (philosophy), the metaphysical belief that possible things exist (e.g. modal realism).
 Possibility theory, a framework for reasoning with uncertainty in artificial intelligence
 Possibilism and Possibilists, a somewhat derogatory term for Reformist Socialism and Social democracy
 Libertarian possibilism, an anarchist current that advocates participation in political institutions

See also
 Possibilianism

Possibility